Emamiyeh-e Olya (also Romanized as Emāmīyeh-ye ‘Olyā; also known as Choghā Kadū, Emāmīyeh, Sagān-e Bālā, and Sagān-e ‘Olyā) is a village in Qaleh Shahin Rural District, in the Central District of Sarpol-e Zahab County, Kermanshah Province, Iran. At the 2006 census, its population was 758, in 147 families.

References 

Populated places in Sarpol-e Zahab County